Saint Blaise Abbey was a Benedictine monastery in the village of St. Blasien in the Black Forest in Baden-Württemberg, Germany.

History

9th–12th centuries 
The early history of the abbey is obscure. Its predecessor in the 9th century is supposed to have been a cell of Rheinau Abbey, known as cella alba (the "white cell"), but the line of development between that and the confirmed existence of St Blaise's Abbey in the 11th century is unclear. At some point the new foundation would have had to become independent of Rheinau, in which process the shadowy Reginbert of Seldenbüren (died about 962), traditionally named as the founder, may have played some role. The first definite abbot of St Blaise however was Werner I (1045?–1069). On 8 June 1065 the abbey received a grant of immunity from Emperor Henry IV, although it had connections to the family of the anti-king Rudolf of Rheinfelden.

Between 1070 and 1073 there seem to have been contacts between St. Blaise and the active Cluniac abbey of Fruttuaria in Italy, which led to St. Blaise following the Fruttuarian reforms, introducing lay-brothers or "conversi" and probably even the reformation of the abbey as a double monastery for both monks and nuns (the nuns are said to have re-settled to Berau Abbey by 1117).

Bernold of Constance (ca 1050–1100) in his histories counts St Blaise alongside Hirsau Abbey as leading Swabian reform monasteries. Other religious houses reformed by, or founded as priories of, St Blaise were: Muri Abbey (1082), Ochsenhausen Abbey (1093), Göttweig Abbey (1094), Stein am Rhein Abbey (before 1123) and Prüm Abbey (1132). It also had significant influence on the abbeys of Alpirsbach (1099), Ettenheimmünster (1124) and Sulzburg (ca 1125), and the priories of Weitenau (ca 1100), Bürgeln (before 1130) and Sitzenkirch (ca 1130). A list of prayer partnerships, drawn up about 1150, shows how extensive the connections were between St Blaise and other religious communities.

During the course of the 12th century however the zeal of the monks cooled, as their attention became increasingly focussed on the acquisition, management and exploitation of their substantial estates, which by the 15th century extended across the whole of the Black Forest and included not only the abbey's priories named above, but also the nunnery at Gutnau and the livings of Niederrotweil, Schluchsee, Wettelbrunn, Achdorf, Hochemmingen, Todtnau, Efringen, Schönau, Wangen, Plochingen, Nassenbeuren and many others.

13th–17th centuries 

The original Vogtei (protective lordship) of the Bishops of Basle was shaken off quite early: a charter of the Emperor Henry V dated 8 January 1125 confirms that the abbey possessed imperial protection and free election of their Vogt. Nevertheless, the office afterwards became a possession of the Zähringer, and after their extinction in 1218, was held at Imperial will and gift under the Emperor Frederick II. While this may well have preserved a certain bond with the Emperor, there seems to have been no question of St Blaise's having the status of a "Reichskloster".

From the mid-13th century the Vögte (protective lordship)  were  Habsburg which  this drew St. Blaise increasingly into the Austrian sphere of influence. The ties to the Empire remained, however: the abbey was named between 1422 and 1521 in the lists of imperial territories and the Swabian Circle tried in vain in 1549 to claim St Blaise as an imperial abbey. The four imperial lordships which St Blaise's had acquired by the end of the 13th century — Blumegg, Bettmaringen, Gutenburg and Berauer Berg — in fact formed the nucleus of the reichsunmittelbar lordship of Bonndorf, constituted in 1609, from which the Prince-Abbots derived their status in the Holy Roman Empire.

17th century – present 
The abbey was dissolved in the course of secularisation in 1806 and the monastic premises were thereupon used as one of the earliest mechanised factories in Germany. The monks however, under the last Prince-Abbot Dr Berthold Rottler, found their way to St. Paul's Abbey in the Lavanttal in Austria, where they settled in 1809.

From 1934, the remaining buildings have been occupied by the well-known Jesuit college, the Kolleg St. Blasien.

St Blaise's "Cathedral" 
The abbey church burnt down in 1768, and was rebuilt as a Neoclassical round church by the architect Pierre Michel d'Ixnard, with an enormous dome 46 metres across and 63 metres high (the third-largest in Europe north of the Alps), during the years up to 1781 under the Prince-Abbot Martin Gerbert. It was consecrated in 1784.

It remains as the Dom St Blasius, or "St Blaise's Cathedral" (so called because of its size and magnificence, not because it is a cathedral in any ecclesiastical or administrative sense). Dom properly denotes or means an important church (as the main church of a town or a city), not a cathedal (seat of a bishop), Kathedrale in German. The effects of another catastrophic fire in 1874 were only finally remedied in the 1980s.

Gallery

Abbots of St. Blaise in the Black Forest 

 Beringer von Hohenschwanden (945-974)
 Ifo (974-983)
 Siegfried (983-1021)
 Bernard (1021–1045)
 Werner I (1045–1069)
 Giselbert (1068–1086)
 Otto I (1086–1108)
 Rustenus (1108–1125)
 Berthold I (1125–1141)
 Gunther of Andlau (1141–1170?)
 Werner II of Küssaberg (1170–1178)
 Theodebert of Bussnang (1178–1186)
 Manegold of Hallwil (1186–1204)
 Hermann I of Messkirch  (1204–1222)
 Otto II (1222–1223)
 Hermann II (1223–1237)
 Heinrich I (1237–1240)
 Arnold I (1240–1247)
 Arnold II (1247–1276)
 Heinrich II of Stadion (1276–1294)
 Berthold II (1294–1308)
 Heinrich III (1308–1314)
 Ulrich (1314–1334)
 Petrus I of Thayingen (1334–1348)
 Heinrich IV of Eschenz (1348–1391)
 Konrad (1391)
 Johannes I Kreutz (1391–1413)
 Johannes II Duttlinger (1413–1429)
 Nikolaus Stocker (1429–1460)
 Petrus II Bösch (1460–1461)
 Christopher of Greuth (1461–1482)
 Eberhard von Reischach (1482–1491)
 Blasius I Wambach (1491–1493)
 Georg (Buob?) of Horb (1493–1519) Buob
 Johannes III Spielmann (1519–1532)
 Gallus Haas (1532–1540)
 Johannes IV Wagner (1540–1541)
 Caspar I Müller von Schöneck (1541–1571)
 Caspar II Thomae (1571–1596)
 Martin I Meister (1596–1625)
 Blasius II Münster (1625–1638)
 Franz I Chullots (1638–1664)
 Otto III Kübler (1664–1672)
 Romanus Vogler (1672–1695)
 Augustin Simon Eusebius Finck (1695–1720)
 Blasius III Bender (1720–1727)
 Franz II Schächtelin (1727–1747)
 Coelestin Vogler (1747–1749)
 Meinrad Troger (1749–1764)
 Martin II Gerbert (1764–1793)
 Moritz Ribbele (1793–1801)
 Berthold III Rottler (1801–1806)

Burials
Adelaide of Savoy, Duchess of Swabia
Berthold I, Duke of Swabia

Footnotes

Sources
 Braun, J. W. (ed.), 2003. Urkundenbuch des Klosters Sankt Blasien im Schwarzwald. Von den Anfängen bis zum Jahr 1299; Teil I: Edition; Teil II: Einführung, Verzeichnisse, Register (= Veröffentlichungen der Kommission für Geschichtliche Landeskunde in Baden-Württemberg: Reihe A, Quellen; Band 23), Stuttgart. 
 Buhlmann, M., 2004. : Benediktinisches Mönchtum im mittelalterlichen Schwarzwald. Ein Lexikon. Vortrag beim Schwarzwaldverein St. Georgen e.V., St. Georgen im Schwarzwald, 10. November 2004, Teil 2: N-Z (= Vertex Alemanniae, H.10/2), pp. 76ff. St. Georgen.
 Ott, H., 1963. Studien zur Geschichte des Klosters St. Blasien im hohen und späten Mittelalter (= Veröffentlichungen der Kommission für geschichtliche Landeskunde in Baden-Württemberg; Reihe B, Band 27). Stuttgart.
 Ott, H., 1965. Die Vogtei über das Kloster St. Blasien seit dem Aussterben der Zähringer bis zum Übergang an das Haus Habsburg, in: Zeitschrift für die Geschichte des Oberrheins, Band 113 (NF 74), pp. 30–44.
 Ott, H., 1969. Die Klostergrundherrschaft St. Blasien im Mittelalter. Beiträge zur Besitzgeschichte (= Arbeiten zum Historischen Atlas von Südwestdeutschland, Bd.4). Stuttgart.
 Quarthal, F. (ed.), 1987. Germania Benedictina, Bd.5: Die Benediktinerklöster in Baden-Württemberg, 2nd ed., pp. 146–160. St. Ottilien.

External links 
  St Blaise's Cathedral and the Jesuit community
 Aerial View of the Monastery Complex
 Sculpture in St Blaise's Abbey Church

1806 disestablishments
Burial sites of the House of Habsburg
States and territories established in 1609
Benedictine monasteries in Germany
Jesuit education
Monasteries in Baden-Württemberg
Church buildings with domes
Religious organizations established in the 1600s
Roman Catholic cathedrals in Baden-Württemberg
Christian monasteries established in the 17th century
Former states and territories of Baden-Württemberg
St. Blasien
Hotzenwald
17th-century Roman Catholic church buildings in Germany